Eupithecia gilata is a moth in the family Geometridae first described by Samuel E. Cassino in 1925. It is found in the US states of Arizona and California.

The wingspan is about 19 mm. Adults are dark colored. There is a small, black, discal dot and a minute white mark above the tornus. Adults have been recorded on wing from February to May.

References

Moths described in 1925
gilata
Moths of North America